The women's 1500 metres at the 2015 World Championships in Athletics was held at the Beijing National Stadium on 22, 23 and 25 August.

Summary
Abeba Aregawi of Sweden entered as the defending champion, although her preparations that year were hampered by injury. In contrast, the world-leading athlete that season Genzebe Dibaba had broken the long-standing world record for the event the previous month.

The semi-finals were definitely a contrast with the second semi run eight seconds faster than the first, still no favorites were left behind.  From the gun in the final, the field seemed to drop back in unison, leaving Americans Shannon Rowbury and Jennifer Simpson out front.	
With no guidance, the two jogged through a 1:17.06 first lap.  As the slow pace continued, the overwhelming favorite Dibaba jogged up to the outside of Simpson's shoulder.  With just over 2 laps to go, Dibaba took the lead and turned it into an 800-meter race, her first 100 metres of acceleration bringing the second lap time down to 68.58.  Simpson tried to chase but Faith Chepngetich Kipyegon, Aregawi and Dawit Seyaum overtook her chasing Dibaba.  Dibaba's penultimate lap was 57.9 with Sifan Hassan moving forward, with Chepngetich, then Seyaum continuing to chase and Aregawi falling back.  Hassan passed Chepngetich through the final turn and the battle became for the silver medal.  With Dibaba pulling away, Hassan couldn't hold her speed.  Drifting to the outside of the lane, she gave space for Chepngetich to move through back into second place.  Dibaba slowed as she celebrated crossing the finish line arms raised above her head, still her final 800 metres was 1:57.3, only Eunice Sum had run an 800 metres race that fast in 2015.  Even Hassan, who was at the back of the pack when the kick started ran faster than any other woman had run an 800 in 2015 by running a 1:57.6.

Records
Prior to the competition, the records were as follows:

Qualification standards

Schedule

Results

Heats
Qualification: Best 6 (Q) and next 6 fastest (q) qualify for the next round.

Semifinals
Qualification: First 5 in each heat (Q) and the next 2 fastest (q) advanced to the final.

Final
The final was started at 20:35.

References

1500
1500 metres at the World Athletics Championships
2015 in women's athletics